Shady Grove School is a historic Rosenwald school located at Gum Spring, Louisa County, Virginia. It was built in 1925, and is a one-story, frame school building. It has a side gabled, metal roof and is sheathed in plain wood weatherboards.  It features an engaged corner porch.  The school was used until 1962 when students were transferred to an elementary school approximately 5 miles away.

It was listed on the National Register of Historic Places in 2009. In 2017 the Virginia Department of Historic Resources approved the erection of a state historic marker at the school.

References

Rosenwald schools in Virginia
School buildings on the National Register of Historic Places in Virginia
School buildings completed in 1925
Schools in Louisa County, Virginia
National Register of Historic Places in Louisa County, Virginia
U.S. Route 250
1925 establishments in Virginia